Death Therapy is an American Christian metal band from Atlanta, Georgia. The project was formed in 2015 by Jason Wisdom, the former bassist and vocalist of Becoming the Archetype. The band has since signed with Solid State Records and have released three albums, The Storm Before the Calm, Voices, Melancholy Machines, and a demo. The band has described their sound as industrial groove metal.

History
Death Therapy originated in November 2015 as a solo project in hopes to create a new outlet for Jason Wisdom to create music again. Wisdom previously had performed with Christian metal band Becoming the Archetype as well as technical death metal project Solamors with former BTA and Aletheian members. The concept for the band began in 2010, but did not officially begin until 2015. Wisdom hired his friend Brian Wages to perform keyboards for the project, while the two programmed the drums on the band's first three songs - "Possessed", "The Lie", and "Prodigal" - which eventually came out as a demo, titled Demo Songs - 2015/2016, which was released independently on February 24, 2016. The band derived its name from the 1991 film 'What About Bob?'

On October 30, 2016, the band announced that they had signed with Solid State Records, which oddly enough the label did not announce until January 19, 2017. Following their signing with the label, the band released two singles, "Self Mind Dead" and "Slow Dance (With Death)", to promote their upcoming album. The band released their debut, The Storm Before the Calm, through Solid State on February 24, 2017. The project toured around with several acts throughout 2017 and 2018. Death Therapy also released a cover, "Crazy" of Gnarls Barkley, as a stream. Following the cover's release, the band announced their sophomore album, Voices. Voices debuted through Solid State on April 12, 2019. The band also performed at Audiofeed Festival in 2019, sharing the stage with Symphony of Heaven, Gnashing of Teeth, and their new labelmates Empty.

On July 10, 2020, Death Therapy released an independent album titled Dance Therapy: Pre-apocalyptic Cyber Funk for Late Stage Humanoids.

On September 25, 2020, Death Therapy and Solid State records released the new single "Reject,", featuring guest vocals from Brook Reeves of Impending Doom, with the official music video premiering on YouTube on October 2. The song is a cover, originally released by Christian metal band Living Sacrifice in 1997.

Members
Current
Jason Wisdom – vocals, bass (2015–present)

Live and session
Brian Wages – keyboards (2015–2016)
Andrew Simmons – keyboards (2019–present)
Josh Seagraves – drums (2016–present)
Blake Aldrige – drums (2017–present)
Josh Seehorn – drums (2019–present)

Discography
Studio albums
The Storm Before the Calm (February 24, 2017; Solid State)
Voices (April 12, 2019; Solid State)
Melancholy Machines (June 4, 2021; Tooth & Nail)

EPs
Dance Therapy Part I: Pre-Apocalyptic Cyber Funk For Late Stage Humanoids (Independent) (2020)

Demos
Demo Songs 2015/2016 (February 24, 2016; independent)

Singles
"Possessed" (2015)
"The Lie" (2015)
"Self Mind Dead" (2017)
"Slow Dance (With Death)" (2017)
"Crazy" (2018)
"My Defiance" (2019)
"Feels Like Fiction" (2019)
"It's Ok" (2019)
"Reject" (2020)

References

External links

</ref>

American industrial metal musical groups
American groove metal musical groups
American Christian metal musical groups
Musical groups from Atlanta
Solid State Records artists
Heavy metal musical groups from Georgia (U.S. state)